The Jacquinot Rocks are a group of rocks about midway between the Hombron Rocks and Cape Ducorps and  off the north coast of Trinity Peninsula, Antarctica. They were charted in 1946 by the Falkland Islands Dependencies Survey who named the rocks for Honoré Jacquinot, a surgeon with the French expedition under Captain Jules Dumont d'Urville which explored this coast in 1838.

References

Rock formations of the Trinity Peninsula